Laga may refer to:

Places
 Laga (East Timor), a subdistrict of Baucau in East Timor
 Laga, Lochaber, a village on the north shore of Loch Sunart, Scotland
 Club Laga, a concert venue in Pittsburgh, Pennsylvania from 1991 to 2006

People
 Mart Laga (1936–1977), Estonian Soviet basketball player
 Mike Laga (born 1960), former MLB baseball player (1982–1990)

Other
 Laga FC, an Indonesian football club now named Sragen United F.C.
 Sport Rowing Club Laga, a rowing club in Delft
 , a Panamanian cargo ship in service 1974-82